English Narrows (Spanish Angostura Inglesa) is a contracted passage in Messier Channel in the southwestern coast of Chile. In these narrows the tide runs 6 knots at springs.

External links
 United States Hydrographic Office, South America Pilot (1916)

Straits of Chile
Bodies of water of Magallanes Region